Yevgeny Vadimovich Roizman (born 14 September 1962) is a Russian opposition politician who served as the mayor of Yekaterinburg from 2013 to 2018. He campaigned against corrupt police, illegal drug sellers and for drug rehabilitation centers.

Early life
He was born in Sverdlovsk to a Jewish father and a Russian mother (his surname is of German origin and is a cyrillized version of Reusemann). His father was a power engineer at Uralmash, while his mother was a nursery teacher. Roizman claims to have left home at age 14, to have traveled across the country and later to have started work at Uralmash as a welder. He graduated from Ural State University as a historian/archivist. He was sentenced to a two-year prison term in 1981 on charges of theft and fraud.

Philanthropy
Roizman is the founder of Museum of Nevyansk Icon at Sverdlovsk region. This is the first private museum to collect icon-paintings. It is located in the city of Yekaterinburg. This museum has over 600 exhibits, including icons, gospel covers, crosses, books and wooden sculptures. The earliest icon is The Egyptian Mother of God (1734), the latest is Christ Pantocrator (1919). Roizman worked in finding, searching and restoration of the icons.

In 1999, Roizman cofounded the City Without Drugs program. He operates a drug rehab center in Yekaterinburg. He was accused by city officials of kidnapping drug-addicts.

Political career

Roizman was a State Duma deputy between 2003 and 2007, and attempted to run for parliament from the A Just Russia party in 2007, but was taken off the election list after a conflict with party leaders. Until 2015, he was a political ally of Mikhail Prokhorov and was supported by the Civic Platform party.

Mayor of Yekaterinburg

He was elected Mayor of Yekaterinburg on September 9, 2013, with over 30 percent of the vote, beating United Russia candidate Yakov Silin who got under 29 percent.

In 2018, Roizman resigned after Russian authorities decided to scrap mayoral elections in the city.

Gubernatorial campaign

In May 2017, Roizman announced that he would stand in gubernatorial elections in September as the candidate from the liberal opposition party Yabloko. He challenged acting Sverdlovsk Governor Yevgeny Kuyvashev, a United Russia politician with whom Roizman has a longstanding personal rivalry.

Political positions

Roizman was outspoken against the 2022 Russian invasion of Ukraine and called it the "betrayal of Russians". Two protocols were drawn up against Roizman for "discrediting" the Russian Armed Forces due to his social media posts and a video, in which he pleaded not guilty on 29 March; the court will consider a third protocol on 7 April.
 
On 24 August 2022, Roizman was detained by police who said he was being charged with "discrediting" the military. Other properties linked to Roizman were also raided by police, according to media reports, which also stated that he was detained because of his YouTube videos; Roizman was previously fined three times under the same law.

On 29 August 2022, the Commission on Security and Cooperation in Europe called on Russia to drop all charges against Yevgeny Roizman.

On 20 September 2022, Yevgeny Roizman accused representatives of law enforcement agencies of collaborating with criminal structures that receive information about his whereabouts and wiretapping.

On 21 September 2022, Roizman refused to testify in the case of discrediting the Russian Armed Forces.

References

External link

1962 births
Civic Platform (Russia) politicians
21st-century Russian politicians
Living people
Fourth convocation members of the State Duma (Russian Federation)
Mayors of Yekaterinburg
Russian Jews
Russian YouTubers
Ural State University alumni
Recipients of the Order of Saint Righteous Grand Duke Dmitry Donskoy, 3rd class
Russian activists against the 2022 Russian invasion of Ukraine
Russian art collectors
Echo of Moscow radio presenters
A Just Russia politicians
Honorary Members of the Russian Academy of Arts
21st-century Russian businesspeople
21st-century Russian poets
Businesspeople from Yekaterinburg
People listed in Russia as foreign agents